WUAW (88.3 FM) is an educational radio station broadcasting an eclectic format that features adult contemporary, alternative rock,  top-40, and country music. Licensed to Erwin, North Carolina, it serves the Erwin, Dunn, Coats and Lillington areas.

History

The station signed on the air on Friday May 11, 1990 at noon. The call letters stand for "What U Always Wanted". The first professional announcer on the air was Durant Cameron, who was a student in the first class of Radio TV Broadcasting at Triton High School in the fall of 1987. Durant Cameron now works as the Master Control Room Operator at WBTV in Charlotte, NC. Former Superintendent of Harnett County Schools, the late Ivo Wortmann Jr. pushed the button to place the transmitter on the air for the first broadcast. The first song played was "A New Day for You" by Basia, from the album entitled "Time and Tide". The students in the Radio TV curriculum Senior Class of 1990 (Susan Avery, James Ball, Carla Hall, Donna Knowles, Jennifer Lucas, Robin Lyons, Melbourne Manning, Reggie McLean, Trisha Murphy, Jay Smith, and Kipp Thompson) were the air personalities on that first day. The students in the Radio TV curriculum Junior Class of 1990 (Ron Barefoot, Ken Blackmon, Kelvin Gilbert, John Jarman, David Kniffen, Michelle Nelson, Chris Peeples, Denise Stone, Julie Walker, and Bill Warren) handled the news, sports and weather on that first broadcast day and until the end of the 1989–1990 school year. Dr. Anthony Harrington, the first Radio TV Curriculum instructor, and a 1977 graduate of the CCTI Radio TV Curriculum closed that first day's activities at 6:00 PM EDT. More students were added to the air staff in the summer of 1990 and they were Doug Butler, Chase Ferrell, Jimmy Hicks, Brian Midgett, and Lamont Smith. WUAW ran a block format of music encompassing top 40, country, alternative, R&B, rap, and hip-hop. WUAW also aired public affairs programs from the Southern Baptist Convention: Master Control, Powerline, Country Crossroads, The Baptist Hour, and On Track. Beach Music aired Fridays from 1:00 to sign off. News was aired at the bottom of the hour with Associated Press Teletype, weather at 15 past the hour and sports at 45 past the hour. Music source was TM Century from Dallas, Texas.

The station's first station manager was Dr. Anthony Harrington (1990-1999), followed by Rick Hessman (1999-2000), then Ron McLamb (2000-2019). The current station manager is Fred Brucker (2019–present). The station is currently owned by Central Carolina Community College as part of its Broadcast Production Technology program. The program was started at Triton High School in the fall of 1987. The station was operated by Triton High School students through a contract agreement with Harnett County Schools. Under the guidance of WUAW Chief Engineer, Dr. Jim Davis, WUAW now operates 24 hours a day. WUAW not only serves the citizens of Harnett and surrounding countries but is a training facility for future broadcasters. In 2013, Central Carolina Community College moved the studios and offices of WUAW to the Bob R. Etheridge High Tech Building on the Harnett County campus of Central Carolina Community College located at 1075 East Cornelius Harnett Blvd. in Lillington, North Carolina. The station's transmitter and tower remain 64/100 of a mile east of U.S. Highway 421 or 215 Maynard Lake Road in Erwin, North Carolina. The program is now open to all four high schools (Harnett Central in Angier, Western Harnett in Lillington, Triton in Erwin, and Overhills in Spring Lake). Students are able to take the BPT courses in the first and fourth block of their schedules each day. As of September 1, 2016, Central Carolina Community College and Campbell University signed an agreement to have Fighting Camel Football carried live on WUAW.

References

External links
 WUAW official site

Mainstream adult contemporary radio stations in the United States
UAW
UAW
Radio stations established in 1990
1990 establishments in North Carolina